Katarina Saša Simonović (born 25 October 1994) is a Serbian swimmer. She competed in the women's 400 metre freestyle event at the 2016 Summer Olympics.

References

External links
 
 
 
  (archive)

1994 births
Living people
Serbian female swimmers
Olympic swimmers of Serbia
Swimmers at the 2016 Summer Olympics
Place of birth missing (living people)
Swimmers at the 2010 Summer Youth Olympics
Serbian female freestyle swimmers
20th-century Serbian women
21st-century Serbian women